Antonio Maria da Carpi (active 1495 - c.1504) was an Italian Renaissance painter.

Life
Born in Carpi, Emilia-Romagna, little is known of his life. He was most probably a pupil of Cima da Conegliano, the only two surviving works definitively attributed to him are Madonna and Child (35.8 × 28.4 cm; Museum of Fine Arts, Budapest) and Madonna and Child (89 x 65 cm; private collection), both oil on panel and both dated to 1497.

Previous attributions
Though previously attributed to him, most of these works are now assigned to Cima de Conegliano or his workshop.

 Madonna and Child, panel, 68.9 × 54.5 cm., Walters Art Museum, Baltimore, 1490-1510
 Madonna and Child, originally panel, later transferred to canvas, 62 × 49 cm., Accademia Carrara, Bergamo, 1490-1510
 Annunciation, panel, 40 × 32 cm., Gemäldegalerie, Berlin, 1490-1510
 Madonna and Child, panel, 31.5 × 25 cm., Musée d'Art et d'Histoire, Geneva, 1505-1510
 Madonna and Child, panel, 80.5 × 66 cm., private collection, 1485-1517
 Madonna and Child, panel, 57 × 42 cm., Musei civici agli Eremitani, Padua, 1490-1510
 Visitation, panel, 145 × 100 cm, Cattedrale di S. Maria Assunta, Parma, 1490-1510

References

15th-century Italian painters
16th-century Italian painters
Artists from Carpi, Emilia-Romagna